The Japanese anime television series Ore no Imōto ga Konna ni Kawaii Wake ga Nai, also known as Oreimo, is based on the light novel series of the same name, written by Tsukasa Fushimi, with illustrations provided by Hiro Kanzaki. It is directed by Hiroyuki Kanbe and produced by the animation studio AIC Build and production company Aniplex. Kana Ishida and Tetsuya Kawakami are the chief animators, and the main character designer is Hiroyuki Oda. The screenplay was written by Hideyuki Kurata, with Tsukasa Fushimi writing episode nine. Composed by Satoru Kōsaki, the music is produced by Aniplex with Satoshi Motoyama as the sound director. The story depicts high school student Kyosuke Kosaka who discovers that his standoffish younger sister Kirino is actually an otaku with an extensive collection of moe anime and younger sister-themed eroge she has been collecting in secret. Kyosuke quickly becomes Kirino's confidant for her secret hobby.

The series aired 12 episodes between October 3 and December 19, 2010 on the Tokyo MX television station. It aired at later dates on BS11, Chiba TV, MBS, TV Aichi, TVH, TVK, TV Saitama, and TVQ. Aniplex USA began streaming and simulcasting the series in North America through Anime News Network (ANN) under the shortened name Oreimo, but security issues involving the illegal leaking of episode two online resulted in the stream being placed on hold. The stream of Oreimo returned to ANN with the first four episodes on November 8, 2010. The series was released on eight BD/DVD compilation volumes, with two episodes each, between December 22, 2010 and July 27, 2011.

Four original net animation episodes were streamed through the official website, as well as several other websites such as Nico Nico Douga, Showtime Japan, and MovieGate, beginning February 22, 2011, with each succeeding episode to be shown in one month intervals up until May 31, 2011. They were later released in the final two BD/DVD volumes on June 27, 2011 for volume seven and July 27, 2011 for volume eight. These episodes feature a break in the original story arc starting at episode 12 and offer an alternate ending from the TV broadcast. An English-subtitled DVD box set, containing both the broadcast and ONA episodes, was released in North America by Aniplex of America in October 2011.

A 13-episode second anime season, titled  (with a period at the end), aired between April 7 and June 30, 2013. The series is produced by the same staff as the first season, albeit at A-1 Pictures. An additional three episodes were streamed worldwide on August 18, 2013.

The first season makes use of 13 pieces of theme music: one opening theme and 12 ending themes. The opening theme for the anime is "Irony" sung by ClariS and composed by Kz of Livetune, while each episode features a different ending theme sung by one of the voice actors. The second season's opening theme is "Reunion" by ClariS, while a contest was held for the second season's ending themes.



Episode list

Oreimo (2010–2011)

Oreimo 2 (2013)

References

External links
Anime official website 

Lists of anime episodes
Incest in television